The Lesson is a 1917 American silent comedy drama film directed by Charles Giblyn and starring Constance Talmadge, Tom Moore, and Walter Hiers.

Plot
As described in a film magazine review, Helen Drayton, bored with her small town sweetheart, elopes with an architect from the city. He allows her very little money, although he spends a great deal on himself. She supports herself secretly by doing interior decorating. When she finds that he has been unfaithful, she leaves him, secures a divorce, and marries her former sweetheart who has also come to the city.

Cast

References

Bibliography
 Donald W. McCaffrey & Christopher P. Jacobs. Guide to the Silent Years of American Cinema. Greenwood Publishing, 1999.

External links

1917 films
1917 comedy-drama films
Films directed by Charles Giblyn
American silent feature films
1910s English-language films
American black-and-white films
Selznick Pictures films
1910s American films
Silent American comedy-drama films